Bhandal Dona  is a village in Kapurthala district of Punjab State, India. The village is administrated by a Sarpanch who is an elected representative of village as per the constitution of India and Panchayati raj (India).

Demography 
According to the report published by Census India in 2011, Bhandal Dona has total number of 192 houses and population of 1,063 of which include 532 males and 531 females. Literacy rate of Bhandal Dona is 77.02%, higher than state average of 75.84%.  The population of children under the age of 6 years is 123 which is 11.57% of total population of Bhandal Dona, and child sex ratio is approximately  1050, higher than state average of 846.

Population data

Air travel connectivity 
The closest airport to the village is Sri Guru Ram Dass Jee International Airport.

Villages in Kapurthala

References

External links
  Villages in Kapurthala
 Kapurthala Villages List

Villages in Kapurthala district